The anterior intermuscular septum of leg or anterior crural intermuscular septum is a band of fascia which separates the lateral from the anterior compartment of leg.

The deep fascia of leg gives off from its deep surface, on the lateral side of the leg, two strong intermuscular septa, the anterior and posterior peroneal septa, which enclose the peroneus longus and brevis, and separate them from the muscles of the anterior and posterior crural regions, and several more slender processes which enclose the individual muscles in each region.

See also
 Posterior intermuscular septum of leg

References

External links
 Horizontal section through the middle of the leg  from www.dartmouth.edu

Lower limb anatomy
Connective tissue